Aborichthys garoensis is a species of stone loach found in the Garo Hills in Meghalaya, India. This fish grows to a length of  SL.

References

Nemacheilidae
Fish of Asia
Freshwater fish of India
Taxa named by Sunder Lal Hora
Fish described in 1925